Mahoning Township may refer to:
 Mahoning Township, Armstrong County, Pennsylvania
 Mahoning Township, Montour County, Pennsylvania
 Mahoning Township, Lawrence County, Pennsylvania
 Mahoning Township, Carbon County, Pennsylvania

Township name disambiguation pages